Rita Marketta Behm (born 26 October 1994) is a Finnish singer and songwriter. She uses her surname as her stage name. Behm rose to popularity in 2019 when Warner Music Finland released her hit single Hei rakas, a number 1 hit in Finland for 10 consecutive weeks.

Career
In 2016, Rita Behm, originally from Hollola, participated in a music camp organized by the Finnish rock band Apulanta. Her intention was to further her career as a songwriter. At the camp she met another young singer, Ella-Noora Kouhia, with whom she founded a duo called Behm & Ellis.

In 2017, Behm sang the chorus for rapper Pikku G's hit single "Solmussa", and consequently began working on her debut album. The first single from the album, "Hei rakas", became a big hit in Finnish charts in 2019, holding number one position for 10 consequtive weeks and ending up being one of the most played singles on Finnish radio stations in 2019 and 2020. In March 2020, the second single "Tivolit" was released and, in July, the third single "Frida". Behm's debut album titled Draaman kaari viehättää was released in September 2020 and sold platinum already before it went out. All of the albums 10 songs charted on Finnish Spotify following the release.

In 2021, Behm received four awards in Iskelmägaala. She also won seven awards in Emma-gaala, including the awards for Artist of the Year, Album of the Year, Newcomer of the Year, Pop Artist of the Year, Finnish Artist of the Year (audience vote), and Best Selling Domestic Album of the Year.

Personal life
Behm announced in 2022 that she is in a relationship with writer Miki Liukkonen.

Discography

Albums

Singles
 "Hei rakas" (2019)
 "Tivolit" (2020)
 "Frida" (2020)
 "Lupaan" (2020)
 "Ethän tarkoittanut sitä" (2022)
 "Sata vuotta" (2023)

As a featured artist
 "Solmussa" (2017 single by Pikku G)
 "Valot" (2018 single by Ollie)
 "Pahoja tapoja" (2018 single by edi)
 "Life (Sun luo)" (2021 single by Cledos)

References

1994 births
Living people
People from Hollola
21st-century Finnish women singers
Finnish songwriters
Finnish pop singers